The Freiburg Open is a defunct WTA Tour affiliated tennis tournament played on one occasion in 1983. It was held in Freiburg in Germany and played on clay courts.

Results

Singles

Doubles

References
 WTA Results Archive

 
Clay court tennis tournaments
Defunct tennis tournaments in Germany
WTA Tour
Recurring sporting events established in 1983
Recurring events disestablished in 1983